Jamapa is a municipality in the Mexican state of Veracruz which stands on Federal Highway 137. Its name comes from Nahuatl Xam-a-pan, meaning 'in the river of the adobes'. The municipality was established on 17 February 1870.

It had a population of 9,772 in 2005 which grew to 10,376 by 2010 and to 11,019 in 2017. Jamapa borders Manlio Fabio Altamirano to the north and west, Medellín to the north, south and east, Cotaxtla to the west and south.

Jamapa is very agricultural as a region; major products are corn, coffee, fruits, and sugar.

On 10 November 2020, municipal president Florisel Ríos Delfín (a PRD member) was kidnapped and assassinated. Her body was found in Medellín de Bravo the next day.

External links 

 Jamapa municipal government web site
  Municipal Official Information

Populated places in Veracruz